Antoniew may refer to the following places:
Antoniew, Kutno County in Łódź Voivodeship (central Poland)
Antoniew, Pabianice County in Łódź Voivodeship (central Poland)
Antoniew, Gmina Aleksandrów Łódzki in Łódź Voivodeship (central Poland)
Antoniew, Gmina Głowno in Łódź Voivodeship (central Poland)
Antoniew, Sochaczew County in Masovian Voivodeship (east-central Poland)
Antoniew, Gmina Sochaczew in Masovian Voivodeship (east-central Poland)
Antoniew, Żyrardów County in Masovian Voivodeship (east-central Poland)

See also
 Antoniewo (disambiguation)